Feyenoord Academy, often referred to as Varkenoord, is the youth academy of the professional football club Feyenoord located in Rotterdam, the Netherlands. The Feyenoord Academy received the official international youth academy status from the KNVB and is located at Sportcomplex Varkenoord.

Feyenoord Academy has been voted as the best developmental system in the Netherlands, winning the Rinus Michels Award for best youth academy five years in a row since 2009. No other academy produced more players for the 2014 FIFA World Cup in Brazil, where eleven former Feyenoord Academy players were active. In May 2010, Feyenoord Academy won the Rinus Michels Award for the first time. Ajax and Sparta Rotterdam were the other nominees. Feyenoord Academy won the award for its innovation within the academy, the overall success of its teams in the national youth leagues and the high number of players in the national youth teams.

Structure
Feyenoord Academy was officially founded in the summer of 2010, when the youth academies of Feyenoord and Excelsior merged. The newly formed academy received the official regional youth academy status from the KNVB and was based on the structure of the former Feyenoord youth academy, with the addition of various Excelsior youth players and staff members. Feyenoord's poor financial situation, the rise in transfer fees and the increase in value of young players signaled a further need for Feyenoord and Excelsior to further support the academy. The cooperation between Feyenoord and Exelsior was terminated as of July 2015, where the academy continued solely as Feyenoord's youth academy. The goal of the Feyenoord Academy is to develop young players into professional football players for Feyenoord's first team squad.

The Feyenoord Academy comprises age-group teams ranging from U8's up to the flagship U19's. The youngest players are scouted at amateur clubs in the direct surroundings of Rotterdam. For the age of twelve and older the academy extends its scouting area, mainly to the remaining part of the Netherlands, Belgium and Scandinavia. Until the U12 team, the players only have training sessions during the evening and are largely guided by part-time coaches. When players are ready to join secondary education they start training during daytime. A close partnership with LOOT-school Thorbecke allows Feyenoord Academy to offer players a full-time training program, while the school adapts its time table to the players training program.

Teams and players

Feyenoord U21
Feyenoord U21 plays in the Beloften Eredivisie and the Premier League International Cup. The team plays its home matches at Varkenoord. Between 2010 and 2018 the reserve team was officially disbanded, but kept participating in the Beloften Eredivisie without a permanent squad. The formation varied and consisted of reserve players from Feyenoord's first team squad, with the possible addition of emerging academy players. As of the 2020/21 season, the reserve team has been replaced with an Under-21 team.

Current squad

As of 5 September 2022

Staff

Academy graduates in first team squad

Notable former players
The following is a list of players who have played in the Feyenoord Academy and represented a country at full international level. Players who are currently playing at Feyenoord are highlighted in bold.

1900-1970s
 Cor Veldhoen (–1956)
 Hans Venneker (–1964)
 Wim Jansen (–1965)
 Jan Everse (–1973)
 René van der Gijp (1975–1976)
 Joop Hiele (–1977)
 Peter Houtman (–1977)
 Sjaak Troost (–1977)
 Ben Wijnstekers (–1979)

1980s
 André Hoekstra (–1981)
 Mario Been (1972–1982)
 Gaston Taument (–1988)
 Raymond Victoria (–1989)

1990s
 Giovanni van Bronckhorst (1981–1993)
 Robin Nelisse (–1997)

2000s
 Euzebiusz Smolarek (1993–2000)
 Glenn Loovens (1995–2001)
 Gill Swerts (1999–2001)
 Robin van Persie (1996–2002)
 Raphael Maitimo (1992-2003)
 Royston Drenthe (2000–2003)
 Samuel Scheimann (1993–2003)
 Dustley Mulder (2000–2004)
 Diego Biseswar (2001–2005)
 Jonathan de Guzman (1999–2005)
 Marten de Roon (2000–2006)
 Jeffrey Bruma (2006–2007)
 Leroy Fer (1999–2007)
 Daryl Janmaat (1995–2007)
 Georginio Wijnaldum (2004–2007)
 Anwar El Ghazi (2006–2008)
 Kelvin Leerdam (2005–2008)
 Miquel Nelom (–2009)
 Stefan de Vrij (2002–2009)

2010s
 Jordy Clasie (2000–2010)
 Bruno Martins Indi (2005–2010)
 Nathan Aké (2007–2011)
 Karim Rekik (2002–2011)
 Jean-Paul Boëtius (2000–2012)
 Terence Kongolo (2002–2012)
 Tonny Vilhena (2003–2012)
 Vincent Janssen (2009–2013)
 Rick Karsdorp (2004–2014)
 Jurriën Timber (2008–2014)
 Justin Bijlow (2006–2016)
 Tyrell Malacia (2008–2017)
 Orkun Kökçü (2014–2018)

Honours
Rinus Michels Award: 2010, 2011, 2012, 2013, 2014
National Champions (Under-19): 1963, 1966, 1967, 1968, 1971, 1972, 1981, 2000, 2001, 2009, 2010, 2013

References

External links
 Feyenoord Academy official website 

Feyenoord
Football academies in the Netherlands
Dutch reserve football teams
Premier League International Cup
UEFA Youth League teams